Alton Township is located in Madison County, Illinois, in the United States. As of the 2010 census, its population was 27,865 and it contained 13,266 housing units.

See also

Alton, Illinois, the city

Geography

Demographics

References

External links 
City-data.com
Illinois State Archives

Townships in Madison County, Illinois
Townships in Illinois